Engalukkum Kaalam Varum is a 2001 Tamil-language comedy drama film directed by Balaruban. The film stars Livingston, Kausalya, Vivek  and Vadivelu. It was released on 9 February 2001.

Plot

Kuppan (Livingston), after losing his mother, comes from the village to live with the family of his uncle Mannangatti (Manivannan) in the city. Mannangatti works abroad for his family. Mannangatti has three daughters : Lakshmi (Kausalya), a soft-spoken girl, and arrogant city girls Pooja (Kasthuri) and Teja (Vineetha), and a son Vellaiyan (Vadivelu) who wants to get married as fast as possible. When Mannangatti comes back from abroad, he decides to arrange his children's marriage. Pooja marries the rich NRI Santhosh (Vivek) and Teja marries Ramesh (Karan), a government employee, who wants to make it big in life. Vellaiyan falls in love with Jennifer (Kovai Sarala) and marries her. While Lakshmi refuses to marry the person her father has chosen and marries her cousin Kuppan secretly. What transpires later forms the crux of the story.

Cast

Livingston as Kuppan
Kausalya as Lakshmi
Vadivelu as Vellaiyan
Vivek as Santhosh
Karan as Ramesh
Kasthuri as Pooja
Kovai Sarala as Jennifer
Vineetha as Teja
Manivannan as Mannangatti
Pramila Joshai as Baagiyam, Mannangatti's wife
Pandu as Ramesh's friend
Thyagu
Vijay Krishnaraj as Kuppan's Friend
Kumarimuthu as Jennifer's father
Bayilvan Ranganathan
Crane Manohar as Jennifer's relative
Bhuvaneswari
Master Arun
Radhika Chaudhari in a guest appearance

Soundtrack

The film score and the soundtrack were composed by Deva. The soundtrack, released in 2001, features 6 tracks with lyrics written by P. Vijay, Piraisoodan, Kalidasan and Ponniyin Selvan.

References

2001 films
2000s Tamil-language films
Indian comedy-drama films
Films scored by Deva (composer)
2001 directorial debut films